Carl-Henric Svanberg  (born 29 May 1952), is a Swedish businessman and current Chairman of Volvo. He was Chairman of BP for eight years, from 2010 to 2018.

Life and career
Svanberg holds a master's degree in applied physics from the Linköping Institute of Technology and a bachelor's degree in business administration from Uppsala University. Svanberg holds honorary doctorates from Luleå University of Technology and Linköping University.

Svanberg served as CEO of telecom company Ericsson from 8 April 2003 to 31 December 2009. Following his resignation, he remained on the board of Ericsson and holds 3,234,441 shares in the company.

Before joining Ericsson, he led another Swedish industrial company - Assa Abloy. Svanberg serves on other boards, including:
 The investment company Melker Schörling AB
 Stockholm Challenge Advisory Board

Svanberg joined the BP board as chairman-designate on 1 September 2009, and succeeded Peter Sutherland as chairman on 1 January 2010.

He and his wife Agneta, an associate professor at Uppsala University, filed for divorce on 17 September 2009. They were married for 26 years and have three children together. Svanberg is a dedicated fan of Djurgårdens IF and serves on the board of Djurgårdens IF Hockey. He is a former ice hockey player himself, having played for IF Björklöven in Umeå during his youth.

Svanberg has received the Lifetime Achievement Award, given out by the security trade magazine Detektor, for his work in Assa Abloy and Securitas, other notable recipients of the award have included Thomas Breglund former CEO of Securitas.

Deepwater Horizon oil spill

On 16 June 2010, Svanberg met with US President Barack Obama to discuss BP's responsibility for the effects of the Deepwater Horizon oil spill. He caused a PR uproar by afterwards expressing BP's concern for the common people along the Gulf Coast of the United States whose livelihood is threatened by the oil spill by saying "we care about the small people", drawing upon the Swedish vi bryr oss om de små människorna. The correct translation of the Swedish phrase would have been "little people". Svanberg subsequently apologized for the term, saying that he had "spoken clumsily".

References

External links
Tricia Bisoux, "Making Connections: Carl-Henric Svanberg, CEO of telecom giant Ericsson, takes on big problems by offering sweeping solutions" (profile of and interview with Carl-Henric Svanberg), BizEd (Association to Advance Collegiate Schools of Business International), January/February 2009, pp. 16–20, 22.

Ericsson people
Volvo people
Chairmen of BP
Swedish engineers
Linköping University alumni
Uppsala University alumni
1952 births
Living people
Swedish chief executives
Swedish chairpersons of corporations
IF Björklöven players